My Cheating Heart is the fourth installment of the Precious Hearts Romances Presents series, It is also the remake of the pocket book "Sweetheart" of the Precious Hearts Romances series.

Plot
Mio is Nadine's first crush and first love. Nadine is sure that Mio will be the only man she will ever love. They are childhood sweethearts until Arlyn arrives in their lives. Mio's attention towards Nadine suffers because of Arlyn, who does things to get Mio's attention and makes Nadine look bad.

Nadine is shocked to learn that Mio and Arlyn are a couple, and chooses to leave for America. After Arlyn and Mio's wedding plans fall apart, Nadine returns to the Philippines and tries her best to cheer Mio up. They grow closer, but Nadine's ex-boyfriend Harry arrives to take her back. Mio becomes jealous of Nadine's closeness with Harry. Nadine and Mio grow closer to what they used to be, but just as he is about to confess his feelings for Nadine Arlyn asks Mio for forgiveness. The reason she did not continue with the wedding was because she was dying and did not want Mio to suffer.

A few weeks later Nadine has decided to fight for Mio. One night when the two are at a friend's engagement party, Nadine plans to get Mio drunk and sleepy so she can get him home and pretend something has happened between them. The plan succeeds and Mio is held responsible for what he allegedly did to Nadine. Nadine, her mother and Mio's mother convince Mio to marry Nadine so he can be held responsible for his so-called "one night stand".

Nadine pretends to be pregnant, but Mio discovers it is a hoax, and with Arlyn's support he files for an annulment, leaving Nadine depressed. Mio's mother meets with Arlyn, making Nadine think that Mio's mother favours her. After learning that Arlyn and her boss were having an affair, Mio realizes that he truly loves Nadine but does not notice it. Before Nadine can leave for America, Mio and his friends and family pretend to kidnap Nadine. When she wakes up the next day she finds Mio next to her. He proposes to her, and after she accepts Mio and Nadine's families and friends invade their room to celebrate. Mio and Nadine begin a happy marriage.

Cast and characters

Main cast
 Jake Cuenca as Emilio "Mio" Santa Romana, Nadine's childhood friend and best friend.
 Cristine Reyes as Nadine Zapanta, she helps Mio get back on his feet and secretly wants Mio to fall for her.
 Bangs Garcia as Arlyn Peralta
 Tom Rodriguez as Harry

Supporting cast
 Beatriz Saw as Pia
 Janus Del Prado as Crisanto
 Bart Guingona as Arnel
 Irma Adlawan as Zeny
 Diana Malahay as Carina
 Idda Yaneza as Yaya Rosalie

Guest cast
 Mika Dela Cruz as Young Nadine
 Paul Salas as Young Mio
 KC Aboloc as Young Arlene
 Jairus Aquino as Young Harry

See also
List of shows previously aired by ABS-CBN

References

ABS-CBN drama series
Philippine romantic comedy television series
Television shows based on books
2009 Philippine television series debuts
2010 Philippine television series endings
Filipino-language television shows
Television shows set in the Philippines